The FIBA EuroBasket Division B was the second-ranked tier of the bi-annual FIBA EuroBasket competition. The two winners of this tournament qualified for the FIBA EuroBasket 2011 Division A qualification.

2008–09 Qualifying Tournament 
The qualifying tournament was played from 6 September 2008 to 5 September 2009. The winner of each group and the best second-placed team played one knock-out series, with the winners qualifying for the FIBA EuroBasket 2011 Division A qualification.

Group A

Group B

Group C

Best Runners-up

Promotional Phase

Statistical Leaders 

Points

Rebounds

Assists

External links 
Full results from EuroBasket2009.org

2009
FIBA EuroBasket 2009
2008–09 in European basketball
2009–10 in European basketball